Mariano Nicolás Mastromarino (born 15 September 1982) is an Argentine athlete specialising in the 3000 metres steeplechase. He has won several medals at the regional level.

Competition record

Personal bests
10,000 metres – 29:47.69 (Mar del Plata, Argentina, 30 March 2013)
Marathon – 2:15:28 (Buenos Aires, Argentina, 12 October 2014)
3000 metres steeplechase – 8:36.75 (Buenos Aires, Argentina, 2 June 2012)

References

1982 births
Living people
Argentine male long-distance runners
Argentine male steeplechase runners
Athletes (track and field) at the 2011 Pan American Games
Athletes (track and field) at the 2015 Pan American Games
Pan American Games bronze medalists for Argentina
Pan American Games medalists in athletics (track and field)
South American Games bronze medalists for Argentina
South American Games medalists in athletics
Competitors at the 2014 South American Games
Athletes (track and field) at the 2019 Pan American Games
Medalists at the 2015 Pan American Games
Sportspeople from Mar del Plata
21st-century Argentine people